Locomotives operated by the Chesapeake and Ohio Railway.

Steam locomotives

Class A: 4-4-0 and 4-4-2

Class B: 2-10-2
Chesapeake and Ohio class B-1 ex-Hocking Valley Railway (and formerly Lehigh Valley Railroad) 2-10-2s
Chesapeake and Ohio class B-2
Chesapeake and Ohio class B-3
Chesapeake and Ohio Class B-4

Class C: 0-6-0, 0-8-0, 0-10-0, and Shays

Class E: 2-6-0
Chesapeake and Ohio class E-5

Class F: 4-6-0 and 4-6-2
Chesapeake and Ohio class F-2 4-6-0
Chesapeake and Ohio class F-10 4-6-0
Chesapeake and Ohio class F-11 4-6-0
Chesapeake and Ohio class F-12 4-6-2
Chesapeake and Ohio class F-13 4-6-0
Chesapeake and Ohio class F-14 4-6-2
Chesapeake and Ohio class F-15 4-6-2
Chesapeake and Ohio class F-16 4-6-2
Chesapeake and Ohio classes F-17 and F-17-A 4-6-2
Chesapeake and Ohio class F-18 4-6-2
Chesapeake and Ohio class F-19 4-6-2

Class G: 2-8-0

Class H: 2-6-6-2, 2-8-8-2, 2-6-6-6
Class H was used for the 2-6-6-2, 2-8-8-2, and 2-6-6-6 Allegheny types
 Chesapeake and Ohio class H-1 2-6-6-2
 Chesapeake and Ohio class H-2 2-6-6-2
 Chesapeake and Ohio class H-3 ex-Hocking Valley Railway 2-6-6-2
 Chesapeake and Ohio class H-4 2-6-6-2
 Chesapeake and Ohio class H-5 2-6-6-2
 Chesapeake and Ohio class H-6 2-6-6-2
 Chesapeake and Ohio class H-7 and H-7-A 2-8-8-2
 Chesapeake and Ohio class H-8 2-6-6-6

Class J: 4-8-2 and 4-8-4
Class J was used for 4-8-2 Mountain and 4-8-4 Greenbrier types
 Chesapeake and Ohio class J-1 4-8-2
 Chesapeake and Ohio class J-2 4-8-2
 Chesapeake and Ohio classes J-3, J-3-A, and J-3-B 4-8-4

Class K: 2-8-2 and 2-8-4

Class K was used for 2-8-2 Mikado and 2-8-4 Kanawha types
 Chesapeake and Ohio class K ex-Hocking Valley Railway 2-8-2
 Chesapeake and Ohio class K-1 2-8-2
 Chesapeake and Ohio class K-2 2-8-2
 Chesapeake and Ohio classes K-3 and K-3-A 2-8-2
 Chesapeake and Ohio class K-4 2-8-4
 Chesapeake and Ohio class K-5 ex-Pere Marquette Railway 2-8-2
 Chesapeake and Ohio class K-6 ex-Pere Marquette Railway 2-8-2
 Chesapeake and Ohio class K-8 ex-Pere Marquette Railway 2-8-2

Class L: 4-6-4

Class L was used for 4-6-4 "Hudson" types.
 Chesapeake and Ohio class L-1
 Chesapeake and Ohio classes L-2 and L-2-A

Class M: Steam-Turbine-Electric
Class M was used for a single class of 2-C1+2-C1-2 Steam-turbine electric locomotives.
 Chesapeake and Ohio class M-1

Class N: 2-8-4
 Chesapeake & Ohio class N-1 ex-Pere Marquette Railway 2-8-4
 Chesapeake & Ohio class N-2 ex-Pere Marquette Railway 2-8-4
 Chesapeake and Ohio class N-3 ex-Pere Marquette Railway 2-8-4

Class T: 2-10-4
Class T was used for a single class of 2-10-4 "Texas" types
 Chesapeake and Ohio class T-1

Diesel locomotives

ALCO
 S-2 58 engines built 1949–1950
 S-4 14 engines built 1953
 RS-2  2 engines built 1949, and later sold to Lehigh Valley Railroad
 RSD-5 26 engines built 1952
 RS-1 2 engines built 1953
 RS-3 2 engines built 1955
 RSD-12 10 engines built 1956
 RSD-7 12 engines built 1956, retired and traded to GE 1969
 C-630 4 engines built 1967, and later sold to Robe River Mining of Australia

Baldwin
 DRS-6-6-1500 3 engines built 1949
 AS-616 39 engines built 1950–1953

EMD
Switchers
 NW2 35 built for the C&O
 SW7 26 built for the C&O
 SW9 35 built for the C&O
 TR3 Cow-Calf-Calf 2 sets built in 1949
 TR4 Cow-Calf 2 sets built and operated together for use on the Dawkins Sub. out of Paintsville, KY.

Passenger Cab units
 E8A 31 built for the C&O

Freight Cab units
 F7A 94 built for the C&O
 F7B 54 built for the C&O
 FP7 16 built for the C&O

Road Switchers

Branch line (BL) 4 Axle
 BL2 14 built for the C&O (first 6 ordered by the Pere Marquette Railroad prior to merger)

General Purpose (GP) 4 Axle
 GP7 180 built for the C&O 
 GP9 363 Built for the C&O
 GP30 48 Built for the C&O
 GP35 41 Built for the C&O
 GP38 60 Built for the C&O
 GP39 20 Built for the C&O
 GP40 50 Built for the C&O

Special Duty (SD) 6 Axle
 SD18 19 Built for the C&O
 SD35 14 Built for the C&O
 SD40 59 Built for the C&O
 SD50 43 Built for the C&O

GE
Road Switcher 4 Axle
 U23B 30 Built for the C&O
 U25B 38 Built for the C&O
 U30B 33 Built for the C&O

Road Switcher 6 Axle
 U30C 13 Built for the C&O

Dash 7
 B30-7 30 Built for the C&O

References
 
 

Chesapeake and Ohio Railway